Khvicha Jakhaia (born 16 September 1996) is a Georgian water polo player for Dinamo Moscow and the Georgian national team.

He participated at the 2018 Men's European Water Polo Championship.

References

1996 births
Living people
Male water polo players from Georgia (country)